Hamilton Island may refer to:

 Hamilton Island (Queensland), Australia
 Hamilton Island Race Week, keelboat regatta
 Great Barrier Reef Airport, formerly Hamilton Island Airport
 Hamilton Island (Nunavut), Canada
 MacDonald Island, British Columbia, Canada (called Hamilton Island 1940–72)

See also
 Baillie-Hamilton Island, Nunavut, Canada
 Vesey Hamilton Island, Nunavut, Canada